''This article is a List of notable pre-college music schools. For a list of the university and college schools of music, see List of university and college schools of music.

Austria 
 Mozarteum University of Salzburg

Australia 
 Conservatorium High School

France 
 Conservatoire National de Région de Paris
 Maîtrise Notre Dame de Paris

Germany 
 Dr. Hoch's Konservatorium - Musikakademie, Frankfurt am Main (Pre-College-Frankfurt)
 Hochschule für Musik Köln, Cologne (Pre-College-Cologne)
 Hochschule für Musik Karlsruhe
 Hochschule für Musik und Darstellende Kunst Mannheim
 Sächsisches Landesgymnasium für Musik "Carl Maria von Weber"

India 
 Calcutta School of Music
 Delhi School of Music
 Eastern Fare Music Foundation
 KM Music Conservatory

Russia 
 Gnessin State Musical College

Spain 
 Conservatorio Profesional de Música, Getafe, Madrid

United Kingdom

England
 Chetham's School of Music
 Derby School of Music
 Purcell School
 Wells Cathedral School
 Yehudi Menuhin School

Scotland
 St. Mary's Music School

Thailand
College of Music, Mahidol University

Hong Kong 
The Hong Kong Academy for Performing Arts Junior Music Programme

Ukraine 

 Dnipropetrovsk Academy of Music
 Kyiv Conservatory
 Kyiv Lysenko State Music Lyceum
 Lviv Conservatory
 Lysenko music school
 Odessa Conservatory
 R. Glier Kyiv Institute of Music
 School of Stolyarsky

United States 

 Berklee College of Music
 Blair School of Music, Vanderbilt University
 Cleveland Institute of Music Young Artist/Junior Young Artist Program
 Colburn School Young Artists Academy
 The Hartt Community Division
 Idyllwild Arts Academy
 InterHarmony International School of Music Online
 Interlochen Arts Academy
 Juilliard School Pre-College Division
 Lagond Music School
 Manhattan School of Music Precollege Division
 Mannes College The New School for Music
Midwest Young Artists Conservatory
 New England Conservatory Preparatory School
 Peabody Institute Preparatory Division
 San Francisco Conservatory of Music Pre-College Division
 Third Street Music School Settlement
 High School of the University of North Carolina School of the Arts
 Walnut Hill School
 Stony Brook University Pre-College Division

Vietnam 

 Vietnam National Academy of Music

 
Music schools pre-college
Pre-college music schools